Roy Thomas (born 1940) is an American comic book writer and editor.

Roy Thomas may also refer to:

 Roy Thomas (outfielder) (1874–1959), Major League Baseball outfielder
 Roy Thomas (artist) (1949–2004), Anishnabe painter
 Roy Thomas (pitcher) (born 1953), Major League Baseball pitcher
 Roy K. Thomas (1887–1977), American college sports coach

See also
 Rob Thomas (disambiguation)
 Rod Thomas (disambiguation)